G. T. Blankenship (born March 11, 1928) is an American lawyer and Republican politician from Oklahoma. A former member and minority leader of the Oklahoma House of Representatives, he initiated the investigation of corruption on the Oklahoma Supreme Court that resulted in the removal of three justices during the mid-1960s and changing the process by which future justices would be selected. Leaving the House to run for higher office, Blankenship served as the 10th attorney general of Oklahoma (the first Republican to hold that position). After serving as attorney general, he entered private law practice in Oklahoma City and served two terms on the University of Oklahoma's board of regents.

Early life
Blankenship attended the University of Oklahoma and received a Bachelor of Arts. He was then admitted to the OU College of Law where he earned a Bachelor of Laws and became an attorney.

Political career
In 1960, Blankenship was elected to the Oklahoma House of Representatives. He served in the State House until 1967. He was elected by his fellow Republicans to serve as the House Minority Leader from 1965 to 1967, making him the highest-ranking Republican in the House at that time.

One of the most significant events during his career in the House, was a speech he delivered in January 1965 that revealed what would be called the Oklahoma Supreme Court Corruption Scandal. The speech resulted in a formal investigation and led to the impeachment and/or removal of three justices, as well as changing the process by which future justices would be selected for the court.

In the 1966 general election, Blankenship became the first Republican in state history to be elected Attorney General of Oklahoma. He succeeded Charles R. Nesbitt. Blankenship served one term as attorney general from 1967 to 1971.

After leaving office, Blankenship opened his private practice of law in Oklahoma City. He would later become chairman of the board of directors for the Bank of Nichols Hills in Nichols Hills, Oklahoma. While engaged in private practice, Blankenship would become actively involved with the Oklahoma City Chamber of Commerce.

University of Oklahoma
Blankenship was appointed to the board of regents of the University of Oklahoma in 1990 by Republican Governor of Oklahoma Henry Bellmon. He served two terms as chairman of the board of regents in 1995 and 1996. Governor Frank Keating reappointed him to the board in 1997. He was elected chairman again in 2003. His second term ended in 2004, after which he retired.

The Sarkeys Foundation has established the G.T. Blankenship Chair for Alzheimer's and Aging Research at the Oklahoma Medical Research Foundation. Blankenship and his wife, Libby, established the G.T. and Libby Blankenship Chair in the History of Liberty, the purpose of which is to emphasize the importance of undergraduate teaching and focus on historical and contemporary issues of freedom.

Personal life
Blankenship and his wife, Libby, live in Oklahoma City and have three adult children. He was inducted as a member of the Oklahoma Hall of Fame in 2001.

References

External links
 University of Oklahoma board of regents chair elected - The Journal Record, 03-26-03

University of Oklahoma alumni
University of Oklahoma College of Law alumni
Living people
American prosecutors
Oklahoma Attorneys General
Politicians from Oklahoma City
Republican Party members of the Oklahoma House of Representatives
20th-century Members of the Oklahoma House of Representatives
1928 births
Lawyers from Oklahoma City